George Washington Clarke (October 24, 1852 – November 28, 1936) served two terms as the 21st Governor of Iowa from 1913 to 1917.

Biography
In 1856 the Clarke family moved to Davis County, Iowa, settling one mile east of Drakesville. He taught school in Bloomfield before attending Oskaloosa College, from which he graduated in 1877. Clarke earned a law degree from the University of Iowa in 1878 and then moved to Adel, Iowa. He married Arletta Greene on June 27, 1878. He served four years as Justice of the Peace and in 1882 formed a partnership with John B. White for the practice of law. From 1901–1909, he was a member of the Iowa House of Representatives, serving as Speaker from 1904–1909. He was the Lieutenant Governor from 1909–1913 serving under Governor Beryl F. Carroll, and then was elected governor in 1912 and reelected in 1914. After stepping down as governor, he was Dean of Drake University Law School from 1917–1918, and practiced law in Des Moines, Iowa. His papers are in the collection of the University of Iowa.

One of his grandchildren was Nile Kinnick, who won the Heisman Trophy while playing for the University of Iowa.

External links
 National Governors Association profile
 University of Iowa Library profile and list of papers

1852 births
1936 deaths
Drake University faculty
Republican Party governors of Iowa
Iowa lawyers
Republican Party members of the Iowa House of Representatives
Lieutenant Governors of Iowa
Oskaloosa College alumni
People from Davis County, Iowa
People from Shelby County, Indiana
Speakers of the Iowa House of Representatives
University of Iowa College of Law alumni
Burials in Iowa
20th-century American politicians